César Augusto Cabral Dipre (born February 11, 1989) is a Dominican professional baseball pitcher for the London Majors of the Intercounty Baseball League (IBL). He has previously played in Major League Baseball (MLB) for the New York Yankees and Baltimore Orioles.

Career

Minor League Baseball
Cabral was originally signed for the Boston Red Sox by scout Luis Scheker, as an international amateur free agent and played in their minor league system through 2010. His professional career began in 2006, when he went 1–4 with a 4.54 ERA in 11 games (10 starts) with the DSL Red Sox. In 2007, again with the DSL Red Sox, Cabral went 5–4 with a 1.76 ERA in 14 starts. He pitched for the GCL Red Sox in 2008, going 2–5 with a 5.59 ERA in 11 games (9 starts), striking out 51 batters in 48 1/3 innings. In 2009, he went 1–6 with a 4.03 ERA in 15 games (9 starts) with the Lowell Spinners. He split 2010 between the Greenville Drive and Salem Red Sox, going a combined 4–0 with a 3.63 ERA in 45 relief appearances. That season, he struck out 80 batters in 79 1/3 innings.

Cabral was drafted by the Tampa Bay Rays in the 2010 Rule 5 Draft. He was claimed by the Toronto Blue Jays on waivers on March 12, 2011, only to be waived and claimed by the Rays on March 14. On March 28, he was returned to Boston per Rule 5 guidelines. He split 2011 between Salem and the Portland Sea Dogs, going 3–4 with a 2.95 ERA in 36 appearances. He had 70 strikeouts in 55 innings of work.

New York Yankees
The Kansas City Royals selected Cabral in the 2011 Rule 5 draft, and sold him to the New York Yankees. He suffered a stress fracture in his left elbow before the 2012 season and was placed on the 60-day disabled list. Cabral was sent outright to the minors on June 14, 2013.

Cabral was called up to the Yankees on September 1, 2013, when rosters expanded. He made his major league debut the next day against the Chicago White Sox, throwing a scoreless 8th inning allowing a hit and striking out two.

Cabral began the 2014 season with Scranton/Wilkes-Barre. He was again called up to the Yankees on April 8 when David Robertson went on the disabled list. As a relief pitcher in a game against the Tampa Bay Rays on April 18, 2014, Cabral gave up three runs and hit three batters before being ejected from the game by the home plate umpire Joe West, despite the objections of Yankees' manager Joe Girardi.  Cabral was designated for assignment so the Yankees could promote Matt Daley.  Cabral was removed from the Yankees' 40-man roster on April 19. On October 20, 2014, Cabral elected free agency from the Yankees.

Baltimore Orioles
Cabral signed a minor league contract with the Baltimore Orioles in January 2015. Through his first 16 appearances in the minors that year (18 innings pitched), he didn't allow an earned run for a 0.00 ERA. On June 5, 2015, the Orioles promoted Cabral to the major leagues. He was designated for assignment on September 6. He was released on May 9, 2016.

Boston Red Sox
On January 18, 2017, Cabral signed a minor league contract with the Boston Red Sox. He was released in March 2017.

Tokushima Indigo Socks
On May 1, 2017, he signed a contract with the Tokushima Indigo Socks of the Shikoku Island League Plus.

Sugar Land Skeeters
On April 1, 2019, Cabral was drafted by the Sugar Land Skeeters of the Atlantic League of Professional Baseball at the 2019 ALPB Player Showcase. He was released on June 28, 2019.

York Revolution
On July 5, 2019, Cabral signed with the York Revolution of the Atlantic League of Professional Baseball. He became a free agent following the season.

London Majors
On May 13, 2022, Cabral signed with the London Majors of the Intercounty Baseball League.

References

External links

1989 births
Águilas Cibaeñas players
Baltimore Orioles players
Bowie Baysox players
Dominican Republic expatriate baseball players in Japan
Dominican Republic expatriate baseball players in the United States
Dominican Summer League Red Sox players
Greenville Drive players
Gulf Coast Red Sox players
Living people
Lowell Spinners players
Major League Baseball pitchers
Major League Baseball players from the Dominican Republic
New York Yankees players
Norfolk Tides players
People from San Cristóbal Province
Portland Sea Dogs players
Salem Red Sox players
Scranton/Wilkes-Barre RailRiders players
Sugar Land Skeeters players
Tampa Yankees players
Trenton Thunder players
York Revolution players